The short-tailed striped gecko (Strophurus mcmillani), also known commonly as McMillan's spiny-tailed gecko, is a species of lizard in the family Diplodactylidae. The species is endemic to Australia.

Etymology
The specific name, mcmillani, is in honor of Australian entomologist Robert Peter McMillan (1921–2009).

Geographic range
In Australia, S. mcmillani is found in extreme northwestern Northern Territory and in Western Australia.

Habitat
The natural habitats of S. mcmillani are grassland and rocky areas.

Description
Dorsally and laterally, it is olive gray, with dark brown and white stripes.

Reproduction
S. mcmillani is oviparous.

References

Further reading
Cogger HG (2014). Reptiles and Amphibians of Australia, Seventh Edition. Clayton, Victoria, Australia: CSIRO Publishing. xxx + 1,033 pp. .
Greer AE (1989). The Biology and Evolution of Australian Lizards. Chipping Norton, New South Wales: Surrey Beatty & Sons. 264 pp. (Strophurus mcmillani, new combination).
Laver, Rebecca J.; Nielsen, Stuart V.; Rosauer, Dan F.; Oliver, Paul M. (2017). "Trans-biome diversity in Australian grass-specialist lizards (Diplodactylidae: Strophurus)". Molecular Phylogenetics and Evolution 115: 62–70.
Rösler H (2000). "Kommentierte Liste der rezent, subrezent und fossil bekannten Geckotaxa (Reptilia: Gekkonomorpha)". Gekkota 2: 28–153. (Strophurus mcmillani, p. 115). (in German).
Storr GM (1978). "Seven new gekkonid lizards from Western Australia". Records of the Western Australian Museum 6 (3): 337–352. (Diplodactylus mcmillani, new species, p. 341–343, Plate 2 & Figure 2).
Wilson, Steve; Swan, Gerry (2013). A Complete Guide to Reptiles of Australia, Fourth Edition. Sydney: New Holland Publishers. 522 pp. .

Strophurus
Reptiles described in 1978
Taxa named by Glen Milton Storr
Geckos of Australia